NA-134 (Sheikhupura-IV) was a constituency for the National Assembly of Pakistan.

Area
Following areas of Safdarabad Tehsil
Bahalike
Following areas of Sheikhupura Tehsil
Farooqabad
Ajnianwala
Jandiala Sher Khan
Town Committee Jandiala Sher Khan
Ghang
Ghazi Minara
Machike

Election 2002 

General elections were held on 10 Oct 2002. Khurram Munawar Manj of PPP won by 44,073 votes.

Election 2008 

General elections were held on 18 Feb 2008. Sardar Muhammad Irfan Dogar of PML-N won by 47,925votes.

Election 2013 

General elections were held on 11 May 2013. Sardar Muhammad Irfan Dogar of PML-N won by 44,397 votes and became the  member of National Assembly.

References

External links 
 Election result's official website

Abolished National Assembly Constituencies of Pakistan
NA-134